William Cary Sanger, Sr. (May 21, 1853 – December 6, 1921) was an American politician who served as the United States Assistant Secretary of War from 1901 to 1903.

Biography
He was born on May 21, 1853 in Brooklyn, New York City to Henry Sanger (1823-1888) and Mary E. Requa (1835-1910). He attended Brooklyn Polytechnic and then Harvard College, where he graduated with an A.B. in 1874. He received an LL.B. from Columbia University in 1878. He was a member of the New York State Assembly from 1895 to 1897. He married Mary Ethel Cleveland Dodge (1869-1952).

He was the United States Assistant Secretary of War from 1901 to 1903.

He received an LL.D. from Hamilton College in 1902. He was president of the American delegation to the Geneva Conventions of 1906.

From 1911 to 1913 he served on the New York State Hospital Commission.

He died on December 6, 1921 in Brooklyn. He was buried in Green-Wood Cemetery. His widow died in 1952.

See also
Jedediah Sanger

References

United States Assistant Secretaries of War
Burials at Green-Wood Cemetery
Deaths from pneumonia in New York City
Harvard University alumni
Columbia Law School alumni
Hamilton College (New York) alumni
New York State Hospital Commission
1853 births
1921 deaths